Dragoje Leković (born 21 November 1967) is a retired professional footballer who played as a goalkeeper.

Club career
Leković was born in Sivac, SR Serbia, SFR Yugoslavia. In Yugoslavia, he played mainly for lowly Yugoslav First League club FK Budućnost Titograd and also spent one season with the well known club, Red Star Belgrade. Leković played in 17 of 30 matches in  the 1991–92 Yugoslav First League and also started both legs of the 1991–92 Yugoslav Cup, losing out to FK Partizan.

After 18 months with another modest club FK Mogren, Leković joined Kilmarnock in Scotland, where he was the first choice goalkeeper during his spell and was part of the squad that won the 1997 Scottish Cup versus Falkirk at Ibrox Stadium. with the only goal of the game scored in the 20th minute by Paul Wright.

In January 1998, Leković started an unassuming stint in Spain, where he experienced relegation from La Liga and promotion from the Second Division respectively with Sporting de Gijón and Málaga CF but was only second-choice goalkeeper at both clubs. Lekovic closed out his career at the age of 36 after playing for AEK Larnaca and Perth Glory.

International career
Leković gained 14 caps for Yugoslavia with his debut on 27 April 1988 resulting in a 2-0 friendly defeat to Republic of Ireland.

Lekovic was in the country's final roster for two FIFA World Cups: 1990 and 1998 but did not see a single minute of action at either tournament as he was the third choice goalkeeper. He was also called to UEFA Euro 1992, but the nation would be suspended due to the Yugoslav Wars.

Previously, Leković was a member of the highly talented Yugoslavia under-20 team that won the 1987 FIFA World Youth Championship in Chile, playing all the games in the tournament.

References

External links
 
 
 
 
 

1967 births
Living people
People from Kula, Serbia
Yugoslav footballers
Serbian footballers
Association football goalkeepers
Yugoslav First League players
Serbian SuperLiga players
FK Budućnost Podgorica players
Red Star Belgrade footballers
Scottish Football League players
Kilmarnock F.C. players
La Liga players
Segunda División players
Sporting de Gijón players
Málaga CF players
AEK Larnaca FC players
Perth Glory FC players
Yugoslavia international footballers
Serbia and Montenegro international footballers
1990 FIFA World Cup players
1998 FIFA World Cup players
Olympic footballers of Yugoslavia
Footballers at the 1988 Summer Olympics
Serbian expatriate footballers
Serbia and Montenegro expatriate footballers
Serbia and Montenegro footballers
Expatriate footballers in Scotland
Expatriate footballers in Spain
Expatriate footballers in Cyprus
Expatriate soccer players in Australia
Serbia and Montenegro expatriate sportspeople in Scotland
Serbia and Montenegro expatriate sportspeople in Spain
Serbia and Montenegro expatriate sportspeople in Cyprus
Serbia and Montenegro expatriate sportspeople in Australia